Stefan Gössling (born 1970) is a Swedish academic who has studied sustainable tourism. He is a professor at the Linnaeus University School of Business and Economics and Lund University's Department of Service Management.  He also the research coordinator at the Western Norway Research Institute's Research Centre for Sustainable Tourism. Gössling is on the editorial board of the Journal of Sustainable Tourism.

Gössling has published, co-authored or presented a number of academic works, and co-edited the book Climate Change and Aviation: Issues, Challenges and Solutions (2009).  With three co-authors he wrote the chapter on hypermobility in the book. He also wrote the book "Carbon Management in Tourism: Mitigating the Impacts on Climate Change" and co-authored a chapter to a Finnish government report on development in a carbon-constrained world.

See also
Environmental impact of aviation

References

External links
Webpage at Lund Univ.
Publications page at Google Scholar.

Academic staff of Linnaeus University
Lund University alumni
1970 births
Living people
Sustainable transport pioneers